The Kyrgyzstan Futsal League, is the top league for Futsal in Kyrgyzstan. The winning team obtains the participation right to the AFC Futsal Club Championship.

Champions

References
 Futsal Kyrgyzstan
 Nalogovik champion (Russian)
 Futsal
 Kyrgyz Futsal

  
futsal
Kyrgyzstan
Futsal in Kyrgyzstan
Sports leagues established in 2007

it:Campionato di calcio del Kirghizistan
pl:I liga kirgiska w piłce nożnej